The 2022–23 season is the 120th season in the existence of Beşiktaş J.K. and the club's 63rd consecutive season in the top flight of Turkish football. In addition to the domestic league, Beşiktaş are participating in this season's editions of the Turkish Cup.

Season events
On 8 February, Beşiktaş announced the signing of Onur Bulut from Kayserispor, on a contract until the end of the 2025/26 season.

On 9 February, Beşiktaş announced the signing of Omar Colley from Sampdoria, on a contract until the end of the 2024/25 season, with an option for an additional year.

On 17 February, Beşiktaş announced the signing of Alexandru Maxim on loan from Gaziantep until the end of the season, whilst Josef de Souza was released by the club.

Squad

Out on loan

Transfers

In

Loans in

Out

Loans out

Released

Friendlies

Competitions

Overview

Süper Lig

League table

Results summary

Results by round

Matches

Turkish Cup

Squad statistics

Appearances and goals

|-
|colspan="14"|Players out on loan:

|-
|colspan="14"|Players who left Beşiktaş during the season:

|}

Goal scorers

Clean sheets

Disciplinary Record

References

Beşiktaş J.K. seasons
Beşiktaş